The Department of the Accountant-General of the Navy also known as Accountant-General's Department was the department charged by the British Government with reviewing all naval estimates, conducting naval audits and processing payments from 1829 to 1932.

History
Prior to 1832 the navy did not have a specialist department for accounting purposes there existed only an office for administering naval widows pensions that was the domain of the Paymaster for Widows Pensions. The Accountant-General's Department was established when the Admiralty's civil departments were reorganized and the Navy Board was abolished in 1832, this new department took over the duties of the Navy Boards, Accountants Department and Navy Boards, Payments Department. The Accountant-General of the Navy was initially one of the new Principal Officers of the Board of Admiralty from 1832 until 1869.

In 1866 the accountant and his department became the immediate deputising function to the Parliamentary and Financial Secretary to the Admiralty, it was then given a partial remit over control of naval estimating. The accountants department, however, had no authority to monitor and track expenditure or estimates of other departments.

In January 1869 the department was restructured with new reporting lines – that which made the Parliamentary Secretary, with the Civil Lord of the Admiralty as his assistant, now had overall responsibility for Naval Finance. As a result of the re-structuring, the stores accounts functions, for both naval and victualling, overseen by the Storekeeper-General and the Controller of Victualling, were transferred as part of the new responsibilities of the department.  The office of the Accountant-General was thus empowered to both review and critique these departments financially, further enlargement of the department took place in 1876 with traditional responsibilities added. The department continued in this role until 1932 when the office of Accountant-General and his staff were merged into the Department of the Secretary to the Admiralty.

The department consisted of a number of specialist accounting divisions with sub-branches that were administered by the Assistant Accountants-General of the Navy, see each divisions responsibilities in the relevant section below.

Accountant-General's duties
Included:
 Ensure that all Naval accounts were examined and supported by the correct documents.
 Ensure that all Naval stores supplied were in conforming within the terms of contract.
 Examination of Naval accounts, the payment of bills, and the recording of expenditure.
 Keeping all books and accounts connected with the receipt and expenditure of the Navy, and including both the Victualling and Marine Services.
 Preparation of all invoices for the payment of claims by the Paymaster-General.
 Review Navy's current expenditure, or the employment of labour and material, as distinguished from cash payments of the dockyards.
 Review Naval proposals for the spending of money on new work or repairs of any kind for which estimates are currently proposed.

Accountants-General of the Navy
Included:
 Sir John Deas Thomson (1829–1832) 
 Sir John Thomas Briggs (1832–1854) 
 Sir Richard Maddox Bromley KCB (1854–1863)
 James Beebey (1863–1872)
 H.W.R. Walker (1872–1878)
 Sir Robert G. C. Hamilton, (1878–1882) 
 Sir William Willis (1882–1885)
 Sir Gerald FitzGerald (1885–1896) 
 Sir Richard Davis Awdry KCB (1896–1904) 
 Sir Gordon W. Miller CB (1904–1906) 
 Sir Alfred Eyles (1906–1918) 
 Conrad James Naef (1923, 1931)

Deputy Accountants-General

Incomplete list included:
 B. Woolsey O'Brien, (1844) 
 William Willis (1881),
 Follett Pennell (1891) 
 Conrad James Naef, (1913, 1918)
 Thomas David James (1920 to 1931)

Assistant Accountants-General

Incomplete list included:
 Thomas David James (1914)

Structure

Estimates division
Included:

Navy Pay division

Invoice and Claims division

References

Attribution
Primary source for this article is by * Lovell, Tony; Harley, Simon. "Accountant-General of the Navy". dreadnoughtproject.org. Dreadnought Project.

Sources
 Hamilton, Admiral Sir. Richard. Vesey, G.C.B. (1896). Naval Administration: The Constitution, Character, and Functions of the Board of Admiralty, and of the Civil Departments it Directs. London: George Bell and Sons.
 Lovell, Tony; Harley, Simon. "Accountant-General of the Navy". dreadnoughtproject.org. Dreadnought Project, 14 October, 2104. Retrieved 6 November 2016.
 Haydn, Joseph; Ockerby, Horace (1890). The Book of Dignities; containing Lists of the Official Personages of the British Empire, Civil, Diplomatic, 
 Logan, Karen Dale (1976). The Admiralty: Reforms and Re-organization, 1868-1892. Unpublished Ph.D. dissertation. University of Oxford.
 Rodger. N.A.M., (1979) The Admiralty (offices of state), T. Dalton, Lavenham, .
 Smith, Gordon (2014), British Admiralty, Part 2 - Changes in Admiralty Departments 1913-1920, Naval-History.Net.

External links

Admiralty departments
Navy Office organisations
1832 establishments in the United Kingdom
1932 disestablishments in the United Kingdom
Accountants general